Naimiyeh may refer to:
 Naimiyeh, Khuzestan
 Naimiyeh-ye Seyyed Naser, Khuzestan Province